Cee Pee Johnson (born Clifton Byron Johnson, February 21, 1910 – after October 1954) was an American jazz composer, bandleader, singer and multi-instrumentalist.

Early life and career
Johnson was born in Marshall, Texas in February 1910 and raised in Algiers, New Orleans.   He first appeared in published sources in Dallas early in the 1930s, billed as C. B. Johnson, playing in his brother Bert Johnson's band The Sharps and Flats. Johnson danced and sang with this ensemble, and also played banjo and tom-toms.

He moved to Los Angeles in the middle of the decade, and played with Emerson Scott's band at the Onyx Club in Hollywood. He eventually became the group's bandleader, and played at several high-profile West Coast clubs, including the Paradise Club, the Del Mar Club (1940), the Rhumboogie, and Billy Berg's Swing Club. His sidemen included Teddy Buckner, Karl George, Buddy Banks, Marshal Royal, Jack McVea, Johnny Miller, and Buddy Collette. His backup drummer was Alton Redd. The ensemble appeared in many films, and was active until at least 1954; he toured South America in 1953.  
 
Johnson worked as a sideman with Slam Stewart and Slim Gaillard on their Slim and Slam sessions.

Filmography
All entries drawn from Library of Congress except where otherwise noted.
 Fox Movietone Follies of 1929 (1929) – N/A (uncredited)
 The Music Goes 'Round (1936) – N/A (uncredited)
 Woodland Café (1937) – Chorus voice (uncredited)
 Mystery in Swing (1940) – With his orchestra
 Citizen Kane (1941) – Drummer in beach party sequence (uncredited)
 Tom, Dick and Harry (1941) – N/A (uncredited)
 Birth of the Blues (1941) – N/A (uncredited)
 Hellzapoppin' (1941) – With his orchestra (uncredited)
 Swing for Your Supper (soundie; 1941) – Leading his orchestra, with Dorothy Dandridge dancing
 Jump In (soundie; 1942) – With his orchestra
 The Desert Song (1943) – Percussionist in Moroccan cafe sequences
 Jungle Jig (soundie; 1944) – With his orchestra, accompanying Dorothy Dandridge
 To Have and Have Not (1944) – Drummer in club group (uncredited)
 The Jolson Story (1946) – Unseen drum soloist in final night club scene (uncredited)
 The Razor's Edge (1946) – Bandleader / Drum soloist in nightclub (uncredited)
 The Foxes of Harrow (1947) – Drummer in voodoo sequence (uncredited)

Notes

References

Further reading

Articles
 Doyle, Freddy. "Orchs and Musicians". The California Eagle. May 14, 1937. Page 12.
 "Season's Greetings from the Musicians". The California Eagle. December 23, 1937. Page 20.
 Helm. "Vaudeville; Night Club Reviews: Rhumboogie, H'wood". Variety. February 26, 1941. pp. 46–47.
 "Cee Pee Johnson Band Booked at Civic Auditorium". The Honolulu Advertiser. September 27, 1947. Page 7.
 "Musician Jailed for Burglary; More About Cee Pee Johnson". The California Eagle. August 9, 1951. pp. 1, 3.
 "'Ceepee' Johnson, Wife Face Many Burglary Charges". Los Angeles Sentinel. August 16, 1951. pp. A1, A2.
 "Cee Pee's Wife Faints As She Gets Prison Term". The California Eagle. October 4, 1951. Page 1.
 "King of Tom Tom Drums". The California Eagle. December 10, 1953. Page 8.
 "C. P. Johnson Crew All Set to Swing for Old Charity". The California Eagle. December 17, 1953. Page 9.

Books
 Royal, Marshal. Jazz Survivor. London: Cassell. 1996. pp. 55–56. .

External links
 [ Cee Pee Johnson] at Allmusic
 
 Whitey's Lindy Hoppers — excerpt from Hellzapoppin' (1941) featuring Johnson's trademark tom-tom act on YouTube
 Johnson's "Swinging It Lightly" — accompanying himself on piano at the conclusion of Mystery in Swing (1940) on YouTube

1910 births
Year of death missing
20th-century American drummers
African-American jazz composers
American jazz composers
African-American male singer-songwriters
American jazz bandleaders
American jazz drummers
American jazz singers
Jazz musicians from New Orleans
Singer-songwriters from Louisiana
20th-century jazz composers
20th-century African-American male singers